Richard-Quentin Samnick (born 23 January 1993) is a French former professional footballer who played for as a defender. A youth product of Paris Saint-Germain, he played senior football in Italy for Bari and Martina Franca and in France for Châteauroux and Quevilly-Rouen.

Club career
After finishing his youth formation with Paris Saint-Germain, Samnick was assigned to the club's reserve squad in the 2011–12 season. After failing to feature regularly with the side, he joined Italian Serie B side Bari, signing a four-year deal with the Biancorossi.

On 23 August 2013 Samnick made his professional debut, starting in a 0–0 draw at Reggina. He spent the 2014–15 season on loan with Martina Franca in the Lega Pro. At the end of the season he terminated his contract with Bari two years early, and returned to France, signing for Châteauroux.

After three seasons at Châteauroux, the last being in Ligue 2, Samnick signed for Quevilly-Rouen on 21 June 2018. He was subsequently release by the club after two seasons. It proved to be the final club of Samnick's playing career, retiring at the age of 28.

Personal life 
Samnick's wife is from Châteauroux. As of January 2022, the couple have a daughter.

In December 2021, Samnick opened a gym in Châteauroux.

Career statistics

Honours 
Paris Saint-Germain U19
 Championnat National U19: 2010–11

References

External links

PSG official profile

1993 births
Living people
People from Noisy-le-Grand
Association football defenders
French footballers
France youth international footballers
French expatriate footballers
French expatriate sportspeople in Italy
Expatriate footballers in Italy
Paris Saint-Germain F.C. players
S.S.C. Bari players
A.S. Martina Franca 1947 players
LB Châteauroux players
US Quevilly-Rouen Métropole players
Serie B players
Serie C players
Championnat National players
Footballers from Seine-Saint-Denis
French sportspeople of Cameroonian descent
Black French sportspeople